The 1987 Greenlandic Men's Football Championship was the 17th edition of the Greenlandic Men's Football Championship. The final round was held in Maniitsoq between August 22 and 28. It was won by Kissaviarsuk-33 for the fourth time in its history.

Final stage

Group A

Group B

Playoffs

Semi-finals

Third-place match

Final

See also
Football in Greenland
Football Association of Greenland
Greenland national football team
Greenlandic Men's Football Championship

References

Greenlandic Men's Football Championship seasons
Green
Green
Foot